DCFC can stand for:

Sport
 Daejeon Citizen, a South Korean football club
 Derby County Football Club, an English football club
 Derry City Football Club, an Irish football club
 Detroit City FC, an American soccer club
 Donegal Celtic Football Club, a Northern Irish football club
 Dublin City Football Club, a now defunct Irish football club
 Durham City F.C., an English non-league football club

Other Uses
 Death Cab for Cutie, an American indie rock band
 Direct Carbon Fuel Cell
 Direct Current Fast Charge, a method of recharging electric vehicle batteries
 Dream City Film Club, a British band
 Dry-column flash chromatography, a type of column chromatography.